Steven E. Levitan (born April 6, 1962) is an American television producer, director, and screenwriter. He has created such television series as Just Shoot Me!, Stark Raving Mad, Stacked, Back to You, Modern Family, and Reboot.

Early life and education
Levitan was raised Jewish in Chicago, Illinois. He attended Glenbrook South High School and University of Wisconsin–Madison from 1980 to 1984, graduating with a bachelor's degree in journalism. He is a member of Sigma Alpha Epsilon fraternity.

Career
Levitan worked as a WKOW-TV on-air news reporter and morning anchorman in Madison, Wisconsin, and as a copywriter at Leo Burnett Advertising in Chicago. He moved to Hollywood in 1989.

As executive producer, Levitan won an Emmy Award in 1996 for Frasier in the Outstanding Comedy Series category. He was also nominated in that same year for Outstanding Writing in Comedy Series category for The Larry Sanders Show. He was nominated for an Emmy in the Outstanding Writing for a Comedy Series category for Just Shoot Me! and two more as executive producer.  Levitan won the Humanitas Prize (for writers whose work best communicates and encourages human values) in 1996 for the Frasier episode titled "Breaking the Ice".  Levitan has also won a CableACE Award and a Writers Guild nomination for The Larry Sanders Show. He also garnered a Producers Guild Award and a Television Critics Association Award for Frasier, a People’s Choice Award for Stark Raving Mad and a Golden Globe nomination for Just Shoot Me!

His company, Steven Levitan Productions, has produced the series Just Shoot Me!, Stark Raving Mad, Greg the Bunny, Oliver Beene and Stacked.

Levitan and television writer/producer Christopher Lloyd joined as partners in 2006 and together created a production company named "Picture Day".  It is under this company that they produced their co-creations Back to You and Modern Family. In 2010, Modern Family won the Emmy Award for Outstanding Comedy Series, as well as two other Emmy Awards: Outstanding Supporting Actor in Comedy Series for Eric Stonestreet, and Outstanding Writing for a Comedy Series for Steven Levitan and Christopher Lloyd.  He has also earned Outstanding Directing for a Comedy Series nominations for Modern Family episodes "See You Next Fall" (2011) and "Baby on Board" (2012), winning the latter.

On June 19, 2018, Levitan, along with Seth MacFarlane and Judd Apatow, announced he was considering leaving 20th Century Fox as protest of Fox News's reporting of Donald Trump's family separation policy which is at odds with Modern Familys programming.

Personal life
Levitan was married to his wife Krista from 1992 to 2018. They have three children, two daughters Hannah and Allie, and a son, Griffin.

In July 2021, Levitan became engaged to Kristina Maria McElligott. They married on September 17, 2022. The wedding was a reunion for many members of the Modern Family cast.

Filmography

Modern Family-related credits

Writer

Director

References

External links
 
 

1962 births
Living people
American television directors
American television producers
American television writers
American male screenwriters
Jewish American screenwriters
Primetime Emmy Award winners
University of Wisconsin–Madison School of Journalism & Mass Communication alumni
Showrunners
Writers Guild of America Award winners
American male television writers
21st-century American Jews